"Somersault" is a song by British musical duo Zero 7 featuring Australian singer Sia. It was released on 17 May 2004 as the second single from the band's second studio album, When It Falls (2004). It was the third time Zero 7 had featured Sia on a single release, following their singles, "Destiny" and "Distractions".

The song includes the memorable lines: "You put my feet back on the ground/ Did you know you brought me around/ You were sweet, and you were sound/ You saved me." "Somersault" was the 100 millionth track downloaded from the iTunes Store since it opened for business in April 2003 when Kevin Britten of Hays, Kansas downloaded the track.

Reviews
Jemma Volp-Fletcher of Contact Music gave the track 7 out of 10, saying: "Another winner from Zero 7 – this time more folky with a plumped up acoustic guitar sound throughout. Sia Furler's vocal is outstanding as ever and immediately transports you to that summer's day, barbie on the go and sun blazing down. 'Somersault' is almost meditative with its glistening strings and delicate vocal - a shining offering from their latest album When it falls."

In a review of When It Falls album, John Bush  of All Music complimented the track, saying; "Sia Furler shines on a track "Somersault". [It's] simultaneously spacy and down-home" 

John Donnolly of The Digital Fix (Music) gave the song a negative review, saying; "Somersault, sounds exactly like their last single. There's acoustic guitar, a soul vocal (courtesy of Sia), violins, the merest hint of electronica... but the whole thing is dreadfully earnest, 'adult', polite, flat, boring, dull... Chill out? This one will go the whole hog and send you to sleep."

Chart performance
In May 2004, The song debuted at number 56 on the UK Singles Charts and stayed in the Top 100 for a total of 2 weeks.

Track listings
CD single
 Somersault (Radio Edit) - 	3:56
 Light Blue Movers - 	5:27
 Somersault (Reworked By Yam Who) - 	8:22

DVD single
 Somersault	
 Somersault (Video)	
 Home (Video)	

Digital EP
 Somersault (Radio Edit) - 3:57
 Somersault (Reworked By Yam Who) - 8:24
 Somersault (Dangermouse Remix) - 3:38

Digital download (live)
 Somersault (live) - 5.46

Release history

References

2000s ballads
2004 singles
Sia (musician) songs
Songs written by Sia (musician)
Zero 7 songs
2004 songs
British folk songs
British new wave songs